Janis Hughes (born 1 May 1958) is a Scottish Labour Party politician, who was a Member of the Scottish Parliament (MSP) for Glasgow Rutherglen constituency from 1999 to 2007. In the inaugural election to the parliament in 1999, Hughes won a 25% majority; this increased to nearly 27% in the 2003 election, despite her accruing almost 3,000 fewer votes. In both elections, around 45% of the votes cast were in her favour.

Prior to her election she worked as a nurse and an NHS administrator. She stood down as an MSP at the 2007 election.

She resided in the Toryglen area of Glasgow for some years.

References

External links 
 

1958 births
Living people
Scottish nurses
Politicians from Glasgow
Rutherglen
Administrators in the National Health Service
Female members of the Scottish Parliament
Labour MSPs
Members of the Scottish Parliament for Glasgow constituencies
Members of the Scottish Parliament 1999–2003
Members of the Scottish Parliament 2003–2007
20th-century Scottish women politicians